Francesco Beretta (born 1640 in Rome; died 6 July 1694 in Rome) was an Italian organist, composer and Kapellmeister and a predecessor of Paolo Lorenzani - a pupil of Orazio Benevoli - at the Cappella Giulia of St. Peter.

Biography 
Beretta's first teacher of music had been Stefano Fabri jr., who was the son of Stefano Fabri. Both of the Fabris worked at the Cappella Giulia, whereas Fabri jr.'s father was a director of music there.https://www.treccani.it/enciclopedia/stefano-iunior-fabri_%28Dizionario-Biografico%29/, Roberto Grisley - Dizionario Biografico degli Italiani - Volume 43 (1993), FABRI, Stefano iunior Intermediately during the years of 1657 until 1664 Beretta was the musical maestro of the cathedral of Tivoli. Beginning with the year 1664 he advanced to be the director of music at the Chiesa Santo Spirito in Sassia in Rome. Later on at the 21st of September 1678 he was made the director of music of the Cappella Giulia in Rome. He stayed there until his death in 1694. In 1675 he is mentioned as "Don Franc. Beretti". In the libretto of the Oratory „San Ermenegildo" he is titled as „Canonico regolare di S. Spirito e Maestro di capella della Basilica Vaticano di Roma" – this is a canon regular at St. Peter.

Selected works 
There is a copy of a mass for 4 choirs and 16 voices - the so-called Missa mirabiles elationes maris, which had been done by Marc-Antoine Charpentier, who additionally added some parts. Charpentier is said to have complained the workout of the counterpoint to be very weak. This copy is recently in the National Library of France in Paris. The mass Dies iste celebratur is claimed to have been created for the cardinal M. Santacroce, the bishop of Tivoli, in 1558 in order to celebrate a votive consecration. There exists a recording of this mass. He composed lots of antiphons, offertories and masses in the so-called Roman style. 

Giovanni Battista Caifabri published the following compositions: 

 San Ermenegildo, Oratory
 Scelta de’ motetti a due e tre voci, composti da diversi eccellentissimi Autori… parte seconda, A. Belmonte, 1667
 Scelta di mottetti sacri raccolti da diversi eccellentissimi autori… , Rome 1667
 Arch. del Capitolo di S. Pietro, Cappella Giulia, arm. 20–23, misc XCI, 429: Cantori della Cappella Giulia, fasc. Maestri di Cappella di San Pietro, s.n. di ff., s.d., 1678
 Salmi vespertini a quattro voci concertati e brevi con l’organo per tutte le feste dell’anno…, 1683
 Lauda Ierusalem a quattro voci, concertato e breve con organo, 1683

Further reading 
 Robert Eitner: Biographisch-bibliographisches Quellen-Lexikon der Musiker und Musikgelehrten der christlichen Zeitrechnung bis zur Mitte des neunzehnten Jahrhunderts
 Giancarlo Rostirolla: La Cappella Giulia 1513–2013: Cinque secoli di musica sacra in San Pietro.
 Arnold Schering: Geschichte des Oratoriums, Leipzig 1911
 
 Joseph Killing: Kirchenmusikalische Schätze der Bibliothek des Abbate Fortunato Santini, Düsseldorf s.d. (1910)

Selected recordings 

 Missa Mirabiles elationes maris, Ensemble Correspondances, conducted by Sébastien Daucé. CD Harmonia Mundi HMM 922640 (2020)

References

External links 
 https://musopen.org/de/music/28805-domine-probasti-me/ sheet music

1640 births
1694 deaths
Musicians from Rome
Italian male classical composers
Italian Baroque composers
Sacred music composers
17th-century Italian composers
17th-century male musicians